Sporting Club Médiouni d'Oran, known as SCM Oran or SCMO for short is an Algerian soccer club based in the Médiouni quarter of the city of Oran. The club was founded in 1945 and its colours are black and green. Their home stadium, Habib Bouakeul Stadium, has a capacity of 20,000 spectators. The club is currently playing in the Ligue Nationale du Football Amateur.

History
The club was founded on 10 May 1945 in the popular neighbourhood Médioni in Oran. Between 1977 and 1987 the club was renamed Chabab Médioni Halib d'Oran (CMH Oran).

Crest

Achievements
Honour Division Championship of West League of Oran (2 times)
 Champion (2): 1963, 1965
Algerian Championship
 Third place (2): 1963, 1966

Stadium
The team plays in the Habib Bouakeul Stadium which holds 20,000 people.

External links
SCM Oran website

Football clubs in Algeria
Scm Oran
Association football clubs established in 1945
Sports clubs in Algeria
1945 establishments in Algeria